Jean Domas (born 1892, date of death unknown) was a French wrestler. He competed in the Greco-Roman middleweight event at the 1924 Summer Olympics.

References

External links
 

1892 births
Year of death missing
Olympic wrestlers of France
Wrestlers at the 1924 Summer Olympics
French male sport wrestlers
Place of birth missing